The smelt or European smelt (Osmerus eperlanus) is a species of fish in the family Osmeridae.

Shape and appearance 
The body of the European smelt is typically 15 to 18 cm long, slender and slightly flattened on either side. Larger fish may reach 30 cm in length. Smelts have a slightly translucent body. The back and sides are grey-green to pink in colour, the flanks bright silver. The tailfin has a dark border. The smelt lives for up to six years. One characteristic is its intense smell, reminiscent of fresh cucumbers.

Habitat and life 
The smelt is a sea fish that lives in the coastal waters of Europe from the Baltic Sea to the Bay of Biscay. A freshwater form, known in Germany as the Binnenstint ("Inland smelt"), is common in the larger lakes of Northern Europe.

The smelt gather and swim about in the underflows of stronger currents in order to spawn above areas of sand. This takes place from the end of February to March, if the water temperature is above 9 degrees Celsius. The egg count per female can be as much as 40,000. After spawning there are often mass deaths. The smelt feeds mainly on small plankton crabs, ground animals and even its own young.

Smelt as food

Commercial aspects 
During spawning the smelt can easily be caught with nets. Outside the spawning season in the autumn, smelts are found in the harbours on the Baltic Sea coast, where they can be caught with so-called Heringspaternoster lures.

In earlier times smelt could be caught in great quantities in rivers, and washing baskets were used instead of nets. In  Hamburg the district name of Stintfang ("smelt catch") indicates this, and in Lüneburg a row of pubs and restaurants, the Stintmarkt, is named after the fish.
In modern times the smelt was of no real significance because it could only be caught in polluted rivers in small quantities and as a result was not in great demand. As the water quality of rivers has improved it can increasingly often be caught in large numbers by smaller fishmongers. Restaurants have especially benefited from the catching and cooking of smelt because the fish is offered as a seasonal speciality. Some of these restaurants have also been successfully run by the smelt fishermen themselves.

Regional culinary aspects
Although it is very small, the smelt is prized as food. Its head is usually removed, but the tail and the bones are not because they are very soft. Smelt is generally eaten by hand. The fish is usually fried.

In North Germany it is traditionally rolled in rye flour and then fried in butter with bacon. Typical accompaniments include roast potatoes, potato salad and Apfelmus or apple sauce.

In the northern Russian city Saint Petersburg smelt (known locally as koryushka) is known as a special local delicacy, famous for its "cucumber" smell. The availability of koryushka was reputedly one of the reasons Peter the Great chose the location of St Petersburg. In March–April the smelt season opens up with many street vendors offering the fresh merchandise; the cucumber smell allows for them to be found easily. Some restaurants feature smelt in March–April as well, and residents prepare smelt for dinner. The fish are rolled in wheat flour and gently fried.

The smelt is also smoked or rolled up and pickled like herring.

See also
 Smelts

References

External links
 Smelt: more information and photographs (German)

Osmerus
Fish of Europe
Fish described in 1758
Taxa named by Carl Linnaeus